The former  was an association football league that existed from 1992 to 1998. Also known as the JFL, it was the 2nd tier of the Japanese football hierarchy following J.League.

History
When the Japan Football Association decided to found a professional football league, the Japan Soccer League (JSL), the top-flight league until the 1991/92 season, was reorganised into two newly formed leagues. One was the Japan Professional Football League as known as J. League, the first-ever professional football league in Japan. The other was the former Japan Football League.

Out of twenty eight clubs who were the members of the JSL division 1 and 2, nine along with independent Shimizu S-Pulse formed J.League, one (Yomiuri Junior) was merged with their parent club, and the other eighteen chose not to be professional, at least at that time.  They played the inaugural 1992 season of the former JFL together with Osaka Gas and Seino Transportation, the top two places in the Regional League promotion series. The initial configuration was two divisions of 10 clubs each, but from 1994, the format was changed to a single division of 16 clubs.

The former JFL ceased to exist at the end of the 1998 season when J.League Division 2 was formed. Out of 16 teams who played the last season of the former JFL, 9 decided and were accepted to play in J2 and the other 7 teams joined the new JFL.

Participating clubs

Division 1

"Seasons in D2", "Last spell in D2", and "Last D2 title" include participation in Japan Soccer League D2 and take into account seasons up to 1998, when the league ceased to exist

Division 2

Championship, promotion and relegation history

Most successful clubs

References

See also 

 
Defunct football leagues in Japan
Sports leagues established in 1992
Sports leagues disestablished in 1998
1992 establishments in Japan
1998 disestablishments in Japan